Sardar Mohammad Khan (1 January 1915 – 26 May 1998), also known as "SMK", was a Pakistani researcher of linguistics.

Early life
He was born in a Pathan family at Basti Danishmandan (Jalandhar). After doing his secondary and higher secondary education, he did his B.A degree from the University of the Punjab, Lahore in 1934. He joined united Indian Army as a civilian employee and retired as a civilian gazetted officer from the Pakistan Army General Headquarters (G.H.Q.), Rawalpindi in 1969. Being a government servant, under the rules, he could not  publish any book until his retirement.

Work
Sardar Muhammad Khan gave fifty years of his life to writing the largest Punjabi-Urdu dictionary in the history of Punjabi language. This dictionary, which has been published by the Pakistan Academy of Letters along with Punjabi Adbi Board in 2009, consists of two volumes of more than 3500 pages each.

It has been written with a scholarly approach, and besides giving meanings and explanations of  Punjabi words in Urdu, it also explains idioms, riddles, children's games, traditions, customs and religious terms. His love for dictionaries was evident from the fact that he remembered all the contents of Oxford Dictionary. He said, "it is the spelling that makes a dictionary: the pronunciation can differ from Peshawar to Sindh, but once you agree on a spelling, one word shall suffice for all". This Punjabi-Urdu dictionary has been proven to be the most detailed and authoritative on the subject as of 2015.

Sardar Mohammad Khan had a command of  Arabic, English, Urdu and Persian and could write and speak  in these languages fluently. He had thoroughly studied the Quran and Islam and could speak in a scholarly manner on any  aspects of this great religion with confidence.

He also wrote a book on phonetics, Aswatiat in Urdu. It is a very specialized book. He got it printed in a small press that he himself ran.

He never did anything half-heartedly. His love for songs that brought him into the subjects of sounds/phonetics and dialects, forms the basis of his philological research in literature. This love made him a scholar of music and he learned to sing 'raags' (a kind of music) and play the sitar.
 
He had a great passion for working on his family history. He worked hard to give details of his ancestors' migration from one place to another with genealogy of the family of the past three hundred years.

Bibliography
 Kuliatee Aswaatiaat (1972)
 Zabanein aur Rasmul Khat (1972)
 Punjabi Zaban aur is ki Boliaan
 Kashmiri Zaban ka Qaeda
 Gurmukhi Lipi
 Punjabi Ucharan Dictionary
 Tazkaratul Ansaar (Urdu translation)

References

External links 
    Punjabi and Punjab
   Dawn Newspaper

Pakistani writers
Pashtun people
Punjabi people
1915 births
1998 deaths
Linguists from Pakistan
Punjabi-language writers
Pakistani lexicographers
University of the Punjab alumni
20th-century linguists
20th-century lexicographers